The Vijay for Best Female Playback Singer is given by STAR Vijay as part of its annual Vijay Awards ceremony for Tamil  (Kollywood) films. The award was first given in 2007.

The list
Here is a list of the award winners and the films for which they won.

Nominations
2007 Neha Bhasin - "Pesugiren" (Satham Podathey)
Shreya Ghoshal - "Nannare"(Guru)
Chinmayi - "Sahana" (Sivaji)
Madhumitha - "Valayapatti Thavile" (Azhagiya Tamil Magan)
Sadhana Sargam - "Akkam Pakkam" (Kireedam)
Sowmya Raoh - "Un Sirippinil" (Pachaikili Muthucharam)
2008 Bombay Jayashree - "Sakiye" (Dhaam Dhoom)
Sadhana Sargam - "Enadhuyire" (Bheema)
Shreya Ghoshal - "Thaen Thaen Thaen" (Kuruvi)
Sudha Raghunathan - "Annal Maelae" (Vaaranam Aayiram)
Swetha Mohan - "Kandaen Kandaen" (Pirivom Santhippom)
2009 Chinmayi - "Vaarayo Vaarayo" (Aadhavan)
Bombay Jayashree - "Vizhigalile" (Renigunta)
Janaki Iyer - "Azhagaai Pookkuthey" (Ninaithale Inikkum)
Rita - "Allegra" (Kanthaswamy)
Shreya Ghoshal - "Oru Vetkam Varudhe" (Pasanga)
Shreya Ghoshal - "Poovinai Thirandhu" (Ananda Thandavam)
2010 Shreya Ghoshal - "Mannipaaya" (Vinnaithaandi Varuvaaya)
Shreya Ghoshal - "Kadhal Anukkal" (Enthiran)
Shreya Ghoshal - "Un Perai Sollum Pothe" (Angadi Theru)
Chinmayi - "Kilimanjaro" (Enthiran)
Harini - "Pookal Pookum" (Madarasapattinam)
Andrea Jeremiah - "Idhu Varai" (Goa)
Shreya Ghoshal - "Kalvare" (Raavanan)
Anuradha Sriram - "Kaattu Sirukki" (Raavanan)
2011 Chinmayi - "Sara Sara" (Vaagai Sooda Vaa)
 Prashanthini - "Ayyayo" (Aadukalam)
 Saindhavi - "Pirai Thedum" (Mayakkam Enna)
 Suzanne D'Mello - "Mazhai Varum" (Veppam)
 Shweta Mohan - "Nee Koorinal" (180)
 2012 Ramya NSK - "Satru Munbu" (Neethaane En Ponvasantham)
 Shruti Haasan - "Kannazhaga" (3)
 Shweta Pandit - "Idhayam" (Billa II)
 Sithara - "Kangal Neeye" (Muppozhudhum Un Karpanaigal)
 Sunidhi Chauhan - "Mudhal Murai" (Neethaane En Ponvasantham)
 2013 Shakthisree Gopalan - "Nenjukulle" (Kadal)
Andrea Jeremiah - "Mama Douser" (Soodhu Kavvum)
Harini - "Moongil Thottam" (Kadal)
Shweta Mohan - "Innum Konjam" (Maryan)
Vandana Srinivasan - "Avatha Paiyya" (Paradesi)
 2014 Uthara Unnikrishnan - "Nadhi Pogum Koozhangal" (Pisaasu)
Chinmayi - "Idhayam" (Kochadaiiyaan)
Shreya Ghoshal - "Kandangi Kandangi" (Jilla)
Shakthisree Gopalan, Dhee - "Naan Nee" (Madras)
Vaikom Vijayalakshmi - "Pudhiya Ulagai" (Yennamo Yedho)

Superlatives

Most nominations
Shreya Ghoshal (9 nominations)

Most Wins
Chinmayi (2 wins 2009 and 2011)

See also
 Tamil cinema
 Cinema of India

References

Female Playback